{{DISPLAYTITLE:C4H6N2}}
The molecular formula C4H6N2 may refer to:
 Methylpyrazole
 1-Methylpyrazole
 3-Methylpyrazole
 Fomepizole (4-methylpyrazole)
 Methylimidazole
 1-Methylimidazole
 2-Methylimidazole
 4-Methylimidazole
 1,4-Dihydropyrazine